The white-backed vulture (Gyps africanus) is an Old World vulture in the family Accipitridae, which also includes eagles, kites, buzzards and hawks. It is the most common vulture species in the continent of Africa.

Description

The white-backed vulture is a typical vulture, with only down feathers on the head and neck, very broad wings and short tail feathers. It has a white neck ruff. The adult's whitish back contrasts with the otherwise dark plumage. Juveniles are largely dark.

Distribution and habitat 
The white-backed vulture occurs from Senegal, Gambia and Mali in the west, throughout the Sahel region to Ethiopia and Somalia in the east, through East Africa into Mozambique, Zimbabwe, Botswana, Namibia and South Africa in the south.

Conservation

The white-backed vulture, like many African vultures, has suffered a rapid decline. When it was first assessed in 1988 it was classified as a Least concern species owing to a large range and population. It was reassessed from a Least Concern to Near Threatened species in the 2007 IUCN Red List after the beginnings of a major decline were noticed. In 2012, more information was available about population trends, and the estimates suggested that within the next three generations the white-backed vulture would decrease by 50%. Consequently it was added to the list of Endangered species. In October 2015, it was further uplisted to Critically Endangered because the decline had reach a magnitude that puts the vulture at an extreme risk of extinction.

The population size of the white-backed vulture has been decreasing significantly within the past few decades. In 1992, the population was estimated at 270,000. Over the past two decades, its population has noticeably decreased. BirdLife international estimated that over the past 40 years, the population of the white-backed vulture has decreased annually by a mean of 4.1%, culminating to an overall decline that lies between 63 to 89%, and such harrowing declines have also been recorded in the populations of its other African relatives. A recent study found that white-backed vultures have a high survival rate. Individual adults have the highest survival rate, while 2 year old birds have the lowest survival rate. Across all ages, the survival rate is estimated to be 90.7%. This means that the deaths of adult vultures will lead to rapid population declines. The loss of adults will cause less reproduction and with younger birds less likely to survive, the population will drop drastically. A major cause of population decrease is the loss of habitat and anthropogenic disturbance. Fires have also caused the destruction of trees used for nesting habitat. Humans also have a large impact. Power lines have caused many vultures to be electrocuted. In Kenya especially, humans are using a toxic pesticide called Furadan, which has led to many vulture deaths. Vultures are also being poisoned by humans, although not intentionally. In order to kill hyenas, lions, and other predators, herders add poisons into their livestock. Vultures ingest the poison upon eating a deceased animal's carcass. This poisoning generally occurs outside of protected areas but is a leading factor in the population's decline. Habitats are also being  disturbed by human land management and direct nesting persecution patterns.

More recent studies have indicated a new plausible factor in the current declination of the vultures. Researches have seen that there has been a rise in toxicity in the liver, kidneys, pectoral region, and internal organs. This toxicity is caused by higher levels of lead, cadmium, zinc, and copper. Although most of these metals level out as either non harmful or normal levels, the lead concentrate in the liver of the vultures (8.56 µg/g wet weight) and in the kidneys (9.31 µg/g wet weight) is higher than the average levels.

Studies have also been performed on the white-backed vulture and some species of Asian vultures within the Gyps clade to see the effect of veterinary diclofenac. Regardless of whether the vultures were given an oral or intravenous dose of the substance, the effects was nearly identical and the diclofenac eventually poisoned the subjects. This chemical is one of the greatest contaminants for the general vulture population because of its presence in livestock: easy food for the vultures.

Another study shows that there are heightened levels of polycyclic aromatic hydrocarbons, HPA's, which is not as likely a product in the endangerment resultant, but still concerning. HPA's, also known as polyaromatic hydrocarbons, are formations of hydrogen atoms surrounding rings of carbon. As common as these compounds are—found in foods, engines/incinerators, fires, combustion—there are many forms, and some carcinogenic. Although there is no direct correlation of the high levels of HPA's in the vultures, there is still a plausibility that it can result in a negative outcome for the species.

Another reason for the decline in the number of white-backed vultures is the decrease in the number of their nesting sites, which they construct in trees in savannah areas and which are roughly 1 meter in diameter. There is an inverse relationship between the amount of human activity (farming, ranching, etc.) and the amount of vulture nesting activity in said area, so as the amount of human activity in Africa expands, the number of nesting sites available decreases, putting the vultures at jeopardy.    

On the 20th of June 2019, the corpses of 468 white-backed vultures, 17 white-headed vultures, 28 hooded vultures, 14 lappet-faced vultures and 10 cape vultures, altogether 537 vultures, besides 2 tawny eagles, were found in northern Botswana. It is suspected that they died after eating the corpses of 3 elephants that were poisoned by poachers, possibly to avoid detection by the birds, which help rangers to track poaching activity by circling above where there are dead animals. Most of them were new parents, leaving their young orphaned and "ill-equipped" for survival. Vultures are slow breeders, and losing over 400 on a week is a devastating blow for the species.

Diet and feeding behavior 
White-backed vultures are obligate scavengers with a high level of specialization on carrion. Their primary food sources are the carcasses of large, grazing animals found the wooded savannahs where it lives. This includes warthogs, zebras, gazelles, ostriches and even livestock. Their beaks are medium-sized not adapted for tearing through tough skin, so they are limited to eating soft tissues, such as the viscera, using a pulling feeding tactic. 

White-backed vultures circle through the sky in search of freshly dead animals, often following other scavenger birds and mammalian carnivores to find it. Gyps vultures are considered social vultures which rely heavily on conspecifics to provide information about the position of food and carcasses. Once a carcass is found, they will begin wheeling in the sky, signaling their discovery to other vultures. White-backed vultures feed in groups and are often one of the first vulture species to arrive at a carcass. This leads to this species having a high dominance at carcasses in comparison to other vulture species such as white-headed, hooded, and Egyptian vultures. 

After feeding, white-backed vultures often rest with their wings spread and their backs facing the sun, as they have gorged themselves so much they can no longer fly.

Breeding 

White-backed vultures nest in trees. They typically choose tall trees along riparian habitats and show strong a preference for Acacia species. The nests are large, around 1m in diameter, and are made of large sticks and lined with leaves and grasses. 

A study which monitored 32 African white-backed vulture nests in the Masai Mara National Reserve during the period 2003 to 2007 showed that the mean nesting success was 59%. Another long-term study conducted in Linyanti, Botswana found that there were rapid declines in nesting numbers during a 10 year period. In 2007, there were 73 breeding pairs nesting in the area with a minimum density of 14.9 nests per 100 square kilometers. By 2017, this declined to 22 breeding pairs nesting and 4.49 nests per 100 square kilometers. In addition to a decrease in the number of active nests in the area, breeding success declined from 62% in 2006 to 37% in 2017.

White-backed vultures face threats from habitat degradation and poaching; as such they have been shown to avoid anthropogenically-disturbed areas when selecting nest sites and protection status is also a strong determinant of site selection. 

White-backed vultures have a long breeding cycle. The incubation period is around 8 weeks and the nestling period is about 4–5 months.

See also

Footnotes

References 
 Bamford, et al. Trade-offs between specificity and regional generality in habitat association models: a case study of two species of African vulture. Journal of Applied Ecology, 46: 853–859.
 BirdLife International (2007a): 2006-2007 Red List status changes. Retrieved 2007-AUG-26.
 BirdLife International (2007b): White-backed Vulture - BirdLife Species Factsheet. Retrieved 2007-AUG-26.
 Gill, F & D Donsker (Eds). 2013. IOC World Bird Names (v 3.3) www.worldbirdnames.org Taxonomy of raptors
 Chomba, Chansa (2013) Nesting patterns of raptor; White backed vulture (Gyps africanus) and African fish eagle (Haliaeetus vocifer), in Lochinvar National Park on the kafue flats, Zambia. Open Journal of Ecology, 3.5, 35-330.
 Mebrat, Tekemariam, Ashok, Verma. Communal Roosts of African White backed Gyps africanus and Hooded Vultures Necrosyrtes monachus in Wondo Genet College of Forestry and Natural Resources, Southern Ethiopia. Vulture News, 64, 5-20.
 Monadjem, A., Botha, A. and Murn, C. (2013), Survival of the African white-backed vulture Gyps africanus in north-eastern South Africa. African Journal of Ecology, 51: 87–93. doi: 10.1111/aje.12009
 Munir Virani, Paul Kirui, Ara Monadjem, Simon Thomsett & Mwangi Githiru (2010) Nesting status of African White-backed Vultures Gyps africanus in the Masai Mara National Reserve, Kenya, Ostrich, 81:3, 205–209, DOI: 10.2989/00306525.2010.519894
 Corinne Kendall, Munir Z. Virani, Paul Kirui, Simon Thomsett and Mwangi Githiru. (2012) Mechanisms of Coexistence in Vultures: Understanding the Patterns of Vulture Abundance at Carcasses in Masai Mara National Reserve, Kenya. The Condor 114:3, 523–531.  Online publication date: 1-Aug-201214-Sep-2012
 Naidoo V., Wolter K., Cuthbert R., Duncan N. 2009. Veterinary diclofenac threatens Africa's endangered vulture species. Regul Toxicol Pharmacol 53:205–208.
 Aas, E., Beyeri, J., Goksoyr, A. (2000) Fixed wavelength fluorescence (FF) of bile as a monitoring tool for polycyclic aromatic hydrocarbon exposure in fish: an evaluation of compound specificity, inner filter effect and signal interpretation. Biomarkers 5:9–23
 Agarwal, T., Khillare, P. S., Shridhar, V., Ray, S. (2009) Pattern, sources and toxic potential of PAHs in the agricultural soils of Delhi, India. J Hazard Mater 163:1033–1039
 Albers P. H. (2006) Birds and polycyclic aromatic hydrocarbons. Avian Poult Biol Rev 17(4):125–140

External links 
 African white-backed vulture videos on the Internet Bird Collection
 White-backed vulture - Species text in The Atlas of Southern African Birds.
 Gyps Africanus on Iziko - Museums of Cape Town.

white-backed vulture
Birds of prey of Sub-Saharan Africa
Critically endangered fauna of Africa
white-backed vulture